Josef Špak (10 July 1929 – 12 September 2016) was a Czech clergyman, and from 1994 to 2001, the sixth bishop-patriarch of the Czechoslovak Hussite Church.

He was elected on 27 August 1994 as patriarch, a position he kept until 2001 to be succeeded by Jan Schwarz.

1929 births
2016 deaths
People from Litomyšl
Czechoslovak Hussite Church bishops
20th-century archbishops